The Southern Research Station (SRS) is one component of seven units that provide the framework for the US Forest Service (USFS) Research and Development organization. Forest Service R&D is described as "...the most extensive natural resources research organization in the world".

Mission
The mission of the Southern Research Station is:

History
The R&D organization has been part of the USFS mission since the agency was created in 1905. As one of seven units in the USFS R&D organization, the Southern Research Station had its beginnings as two separate entities – the Southern Forest Experiment Station and the Southeastern Forest Experiment Station. During their formative years, major areas of research in these two experiment stations included:
 Mensuration
 Growth & yield
 Harvest and reproduction cutting methods
 Gum naval stores production
 Thinning research in even-aged, second-growth loblolly and shortleaf pine stands
 Forest fire research

Southern Forest Experiment Station (SFES)
Initiated in 1921, the SFES was responsible for research in southern pine types within the states of South Carolina, Georgia, Florida, Alabama, Mississippi, Louisiana, East Texas and southern Arkansas. The SFES was headquartered in New Orleans, LA.

Southeastern Forest Experiment Station (SEFES)
The SEFES began as the Appalachian Station in 1921, with its research scope being generally limited to mountain hardwood types. States within the Appalachian Station included North Carolina, South Carolina, northern Georgia, Virginia, West Virginia, eastern Kentucky, and eastern Tennessee. After World War II, the Appalachian Station was redesignated as the Southeastern Forest Experiment Station, and research was expanded to include both pine and hardwood types from Florida through Virginia. Headquarters for the Appalachian Station and SEFES were in Asheville, NC.

Southern Research Station (SRS)
In 1995, the Southern and Southeastern Forest Experiment Stations merged to form the Southern Research Station with headquarters in Asheville, NC. Research was expanded into new fields to address "...how climate change, human population growth, invasive plants, pathogens, and fire affect the provision of timber, wildlife, clean air and water, and recreation, as well as other ecosystem services."

Thirteen US states are located within the boundary of the Southern Research Station.

SRS Science Centers and Research Work Units
As of 2022, SRS research activities were being conducted within 15 Research Work Units located throughout the southeastern US and were categorized under four scientific objectives or science centers.

SRS Experimental Forests
Within the SRS, there are 20 Experimental forests and/or Rangelands located in nine southeastern states. These experimental forests and rangelands provide a network for conducting long-term research studies and are a treasure trove of accumulated historical sampling data that span a time period of up to 100 years. Experimental forests also serve as education and demonstration sites where researchers interact with students, forest landowners, and forest managers.

Research Natural Areas
In 2022, there were 33 established Research Natural Areas (RNA) located within 12 southeastern US states, excluding Tennessee. At least two Research Natural Areas are located within the boundaries of the Southern Research Station's Experimental Forests:
The Harrison Research Natural Area is located within the Harrison Experimental Forest. This portion of the experimental forest contains  that were designated as a RNA in 1989. When assessed in 1991, the overstory component within this RNA was 90% longleaf pines (Pinus palustris) that established naturally from seeds after the virgin pine forests were clearcut in the 1920s.
The R. R. Reynolds Research Natural Area is located within the Crossett Experimental Forest. Other than fire protection, the R.R. Reynolds RNA was set aside from active forest management in 1943 to provide a contrast to managed stands. Based on a 1993 tree inventory, the RRRRNA was described as "... a closed–canopy, mature loblolly pine (Pinus taeda)–hardwood forest", with oaks (Quercus spp.) being the predominant overstory hardwood component. This  forest area was designated as a RNA in 2005.

Gallery

SRS Crossett Experimental Forest headquarters timeline
This 60-year pictorial timeline is indicative of the USFS commitment to maintaining the infrastructure needed to support long-term forest research.

See also
 Bent Creek Campus of the Appalachian Forest Experiment Station
 William Willard Ashe
 Henry E. Hardtner
 Peter Koch (wood scientist)
 John C. Moser
 Carl A. Schenck

References

External links
 Publications of the Southern Forest Experiment Station: 1921 – 1954
 Publications of the Southeastern Forest Experiment Station: 1921–1958
 USDA Forest Service TREESEARCH

United States Forest Service
Nature conservation organizations based in the United States
Forestry research
Research and development in the United States
Government agencies established in 1921
United States Forest Service protected areas